VicRoads is a government joint venture in the state of Victoria, Australia. In the state, it is responsible for driver licensing and vehicle registration. It is owned and operated through a joint venture between the Victorian government and a consortium made up of Aware Super, Australian Retirement Trust and Macquarie Asset Management.

Before July 2019, it was the road and traffic authority in Victoria, responsible also for maintenance and construction of the arterial road network, and road safety policy and research. These functions were transferred or delegated to the Department of Transport on 1 July 2019.

The main VicRoads administration is located in the Rialto Towers in Melbourne. There is also a regional administration office in Ballarat, which is now home to the VicRoads call centre. In addition VicRoads operates many offices servicing the public in registration and licensing throughout metropolitan Melbourne and regional Victoria.

Governance 
In 1983, the Country Roads Board was replaced by the Road Construction Authority, under the Transport Act 1983. In 1989, the Road Traffic Authority was merged with the Road Construction Authority to form the Roads Corporation, trading under the name VicRoads.

VicRoads was re-established on 1 July 2010 under the Transport Integration Act, which establishes a framework for an integrated and sustainable transport system in Victoria and empowers the key Victorian Government agencies with responsibility for the State's land and water transport system. The Act provides that VicRoads' primary object is to provide, operate and maintain the road system consistent with the vision statement in the Act and objectives which emphasise transport integration and sustainability. The statute also requires VicRoads to "...manage the road system in a manner which supports a sustainable Victoria by seeking to increase the share of public transport, walking and cycling trips as a proportion of all transport trips in Victoria..."

In July 2016, the government announced the creation of Transport for Victoria, a new statutory authority combining planning functions of Public Transport Victoria and VicRoads as well as functions of other agencies.

On 1 July 2018, the Major Road Projects Authority was formed, with the function of administering specified road projects transferred from VicRoads to the new authority. On 1 January 2019, the Department of Transport and its major project authority, the Major Transport Infrastructure Authority (MTIA) was formed. The Major Road Projects Authority was renamed Major Road Projects Victoria (MRPV) and became part of MTIA.

In April 2019, it was announced that VicRoads would cease to exist as an independent entity from 30 June 2019 with its functions merged with those of Public Transport Victoria into a new division of the Department of Transport. Announcing the reforms, Premier Daniel Andrews argued that the reform would go "one step beyond" the formation of Transport for Victoria, and said that merging the two agencies would lead to planning of an integrated and mode-agnostic transport network. Although the Rail, Tram and Bus Union supported the government's decision, the Australian Services Union, representing a large number of VicRoads administrative staff, opposed the merger. On 1 July 2019, most of VicRoads functions were absorbed into the Department of Transport, excluding registration and licensing functions and some heavy vehicle functions, which remained under VicRoads.

Operations 
From 1 July 2019, VicRoads' remaining functions were registration and licensing, and heavy vehicle compliance, enforcement and investigation functions.

On 1 January 2020, all road management functions and responsibilities of VicRoads were transferred to and vested in the Head, Transport for Victoria, an office established under section 64A of the Transport Integration Act 2010 and currently held by the Secretary of Department of Transport. This meant that any reference to VicRoads in road management standards and other technical information must be construed as a reference to Head, Transport for Victoria.

In March 2021, the Victorian Government made an in-principle decision to progress a joint venture model for VicRoads registration, licensing and custom plates. On 30 June 2022 the Roads Corporation ceased to exist through a legislative abolition. On 1 July 2022 partial privatisation formally went into effect for VicRoads through a joint venture model.

See also 

 Transport Integration Act
 Accident Towing Services Act
 Australian Road Rules
 Public Transport Victoria
 Bus Safety Act
 Transport Act 1983
 Transport (Compliance and Miscellaneous) Act 1983

References

External links 

VicRoads Office Locations
 Transport Integration Act (Department of Transport - Official Site)
VicRoads Official Twitter

Transport in Victoria (Australia)
Government agencies of Victoria (Australia)
Road authorities
Government agencies established in 1989
Government agencies disestablished in 2019
1989 establishments in Australia
2019 disestablishments in Australia
State departments of transport of Australia
Motor vehicle registration agencies
Organisations based in Melbourne